National Narrowcasting Network LLC or N³ is a U.S. company based in Memphis, Tennessee, which installs LCD television monitors in public places and broadcasts television commercials to them.  At a cost of 10,000 U.S. dollars each, the company recoups its investment in the units by keeping 90% of the advertising revenue it earns, paying the other 10% as rent to the owner of the space.

As a test market, N³ has installed about 40 of the units in bathrooms of bars and nightclubs in metro Atlanta.  It intends to expand to hotels, theme parks, student centers, liquor stores, and even banks.  The chief demographic is ages 21 to 35.

Besides Atlanta, tests have also been conducted in Los Angeles and San Francisco, with plans for New York, Dallas, Chicago, and Miami.

N³ has also installed the devices in MARTA stations (Atlanta's metro transit system).

Atlanta's Titan Network LLC has provided consulting, market research, public relations and advertising for N³.

Companies based in Memphis, Tennessee
Telecommunications companies of the United States